Khandaker Mosharraf Hossain (born 25 September 1942) is a Bangladeshi politician. He is the incumbent Jatiya Sangsad member representing the Faridpur-3 constituency since 2009. He served as a minister of the Minister of Labour and Employment, Minister of Expatriates' Welfare and Overseas Employment and Minister of Local Government and Rural Development and Co-operative.

Early life and education
Hossain was born on 25 September 1942 to a Bengali Muslim family of Khandakars from Faridpur. His father, Khandaker Nurul Islam, was a member of the first National Parliament of Bangladesh. Hossain completed his BSc in Civil Engineering 1963 and MSc in Traffic and Highway Engineering from Bangladesh University of Engineering and Technology (BUET). He also studied at Strathclyde University and earned the degree of Masters of Engineering.

Career
Hossain was the first chief engineer of the Rural Workers' Programme in Bangladesh. From 1973 to 1980 he worked as the project director of this program. He joined BUET as a visiting professor in 1980. He worked as the chief technical consultant of ILO in Sierra-Leone during 1980-89 and Uganda during 1989–90. He was the president of Bangladesh Chamber of Industries (BCI) for two terms.

Hossain was elected to Parliament from Faridpur-3 as a Awami League candidate. He defeated former member of parliament Chowdhury Kamal Ibne Yusuf who was running as an independent. He was the President of International Labour Conference from June 2009 to June 2010. He was the president of Colombo Process, a forum of 11 Asian labour sending countries. The 4th Ministerial Consultation of Colombo Process was held in Dhaka from 19 to 21 April 2011 under his chairmanship. Hossain received Journalist Association Award for his contribution to the trade and industrial sector of Bangladesh.

Hossain was elected to parliament in 2014 from Faridpur-3 as an Awami League candidate. He was elected unopposed as the election was boycotted by all major parties.

In August 2015, Swapan Kumar Paul, an Awami League politician from Faridpur District filled an Information and Communication Technology Act case against Journalist Probir Sikder, for “tarnishing the image” of Hossain. Sikder was arrested from Faridpur by Bangladesh Police. Sikder was released on bail on 20 August 2015 after Hossain asked the prosecution to not oppose his bail.

In July 2017, Hossain said that water logging in Bangladesh will not happen from next year at the annual conference of deputy commissioners of Bangladesh.

Hossain was re-elected to parliament from Faridpur-3 as an Awami League candidate in 2018.

Personal life
Hossain has a son, Khandaker Mashrur Hossain, who is married  to Saima Wazed, the daughter of Prime Minister Sheikh Hasina.

In June 2020, two brothers, Imtiaz Hasan, President of Faridpur Press Club, and Sajjad Hossain alias Barkat, General Secretary of Faridpur District Awami League, were detained with 25.45 billion taka in illicit money. The brothers were under the protection of Hossain's brother, Khandaker Mohtesam Hossain Babar, and Hossain's personal secretary, AHM Fuad. They were charged along with Khandakar Nazmul Islam Levi and Ashiqur Rahman Farhan, President and General Secretary of Faridpur unit of Jubo League, Fahad bin Wazed Fahin alias Fahim, General Secretary of Faridpur District unit of Bangladesh Awami Swechasebak League and three other Jubo League politicians.

On 8 March 2022, Hossain's brother, Khandaker Mohtesam Hossain Babar, was arrested for embezzling ৳250,000,000.

References 

1942 births
Living people
People from Faridpur District
Bangladesh University of Engineering and Technology alumni
Awami League politicians
9th Jatiya Sangsad members
10th Jatiya Sangsad members
11th Jatiya Sangsad members
Local Government, Rural Development and Co-operatives ministers
Expatriates' Welfare and Overseas Employment ministers
Labour and Employment ministers of Bangladesh